Rhysotoechia is a genus of tropical rainforest trees, constituting part of the plant family Sapindaceae.

Botanical science knows of about twenty species, found growing naturally in New Guinea, in eastern Queensland, central eastern and north eastern New South Wales, Australia, Borneo, Sulawesi, the Moluccas, the Philippines and additional places in Malesia. Some species have not yet become well known and more collecting may reveal yet more species.

Species
This listing may be incomplete and was sourced from the Australian Plant Name Index, the Australian Plant Census, the Australian Tropical Rainforest Plants (2010) information system, original taxonomic research publications, Flora Malesiana and the Flora of Australia.

 Rhysotoechia applanata  – New Guinea
 Rhysotoechia bifoliolata  – E. Qld, CE & NE. NSW, Australia
 subsp. bifoliolata – E. Qld, CE & NE. NSW, Australia
 subsp. nitida  – Cape York Peninsula endemic, Australia

 Rhysotoechia bilocularis  – New Guinea
 Rhysotoechia congesta  – New Guinea
 Rhysotoechia elongata  – New Guinea
 Rhysotoechia etmanii  – New Guinea
 Rhysotoechia flavescens  – NE. Qld rainforest endemic, Australia
 Rhysotoechia florulenta  – NE. Qld mountains rainforest endemic, Australia
 Rhysotoechia gracilipes  – New Guinea
 Rhysotoechia koordersii  – Borneo, Sulawesi, Malesia
 Rhysotoechia mortoniana  – NE. Qld upland and mountains rainforest endemic, Australia
 Rhysotoechia multiscapa  – New Guinea
 Rhysotoechia obtusa  – New Guinea
 Rhysotoechia ramiflora  – Borneo, Sulawesi, Philippines, Malesia
 Rhysotoechia robertsonii  – NE. Qld rainforest, Australia and New Guinea
 Rhysotoechia welzeniana  – New Guinea
Imperfectly known species according to the Flora Malesiana, awaiting better description and confirmation
 Rhysotoechia grandifolia  – Borneo, Moluccas, Malesia
 Rhysotoechia longipaniculata  – New Guinea
 Rhysotoechia momiensis  – New Guinea
 Rhysotoechia sp. Waigeo Island, West Papua

References

Cited works 

 
 

 

Flora of New Guinea
Flora of Papua New Guinea
Flora of New South Wales
Flora of Queensland
Trees of Vanuatu
Flora of Borneo
Flora of Malesia
Flora of the Philippines
Sapindaceae
Sapindaceae genera
Sapindales of Australia